Deng is also a common first or last name used among the tribes of South Sudan, shared by the Dinkas, Nuers and Shilluks. It has various meanings; for instance, it means "Rain" in Dinka. The Dinkas also believe that the most powerful god, ruler of all gods, is Deng.

People with the name originating in South Sudan include:

Given name
 Deng Adel (born 1996), South Sudan-born Australian basketball player
 Deng Adut (born ), defence lawyer and New South Wales Australian of the Year for 2017
 Deng Deng (born 1992), South Sudanese-Australian basketball player

Surname

 Ajak Deng (born 1989), Australian fashion model 
 Ajou Deng (born 1978), British basketball player; older son of Aldo
 Aldo Deng, former South Sudanese politician (1967–1989), father of Ajou Deng and Luol Deng
 Ataui Deng (born 1991), Sudanese-American model
 Dominic Dim Deng (1950–2008), South Sudanese military commander
 Joseph Deng (born 1998), Australian middle distance runner
 Francis Deng, South Sudanese politician
 Luol Deng (born 1985), South Sudan-born British basketball player; younger son of Aldo
 Majok Deng (born 1993), Australian basketballer
 Peter Deng (born 2992), Australian footballer
 Thomas Deng (born 1997), Australian footballer
 Valentino Achak Deng, South Sudanese refugee and activist in the U.S.

See also

Deng (Chinese surname) for the Chinese name